The Solid North refers to the regional voting bloc of the northern provinces of the Philippines for politicians of Ilocano descent, more particularly the Marcos family and their allies, and also economic issues affecting the Ilocanos in general such as the tobacco industry. Often included in Solid North are the provinces in the Ilocos Region, Cordillera Administrative Region (CAR), and Cagayan Valley.

The Solid North was most prominent during the presidency of Ferdinand Marcos, but waned after his ouster as a result of the People Power Revolution; the north no longer delivered a reliable bloc vote from 1992 until 2016, when Ferdinand Marcos' son, Bongbong Marcos, ran for the vice presidency in 2016 and won in the Solid North, except for Batanes.

Its southern counterpart, called Solid South (not to be confused with the American Solid South), refers to either part or all of Mindanao as a voting bloc, supporting politicians from Mindanao, especially the Duterte family and their allies. The term "Solid South" first emerged after then Davao City mayor Rodrigo Duterte won the presidency with a majority of provinces in Mindanao voting for him.

History

Prior to independence 
In the first national elections in 1907, the North became a stronghold of the Progresista Party, the primary opposition party to the Nacionalista Party at that time.

Third Republic presidential elections 
Before the election of Ferdinand Marcos in 1965, it was President Elpidio Quirino who consistently carried the Ilocano heartland in the presidential elections during which he was a candidate. Despite Ramon Magsaysay's landslide victory in the 1953 presidential election, Quirino still won in his home province of Ilocos Sur, as well as Ilocos Norte, Abra and La Union.

In the 1965 presidential election, Senator Ferdinand Marcos of the Nacionalista Party, from Ilocos Norte, faced the incumbent president Diosdado Macapagal of the Liberal Party, who hailed from Pampanga. Marcos successfully campaigned on the issues of graft, peace and order, and economic progress, although these had been staple campaign issues since independence. Marcos carried not only the Solid North, but most of Luzon as well, with Macapagal only carrying the provinces of Pampanga, Tarlac and Bataan.

While Marcos won an even larger mandate during his successful reelection bid in 1969, support from the Solid North was not as crucial in his victory. Pampanga and Antique in the Visayas were the only provinces that he did not win.

1986 snap presidential election 
Marcos eventually declared martial law and stayed in power until 1986, when he called for a "snap election". With his popularity declining after the assassination of Benigno Aquino Jr., Marcos relied heavily on support from the Solid North in the 1986 election, when he faced Aquino's widow, Corazon Aquino. Marcos depended on the Ilocos Region, described as "impregnable to the opposition", and on Eastern Visayas, the home region of his wife, First Lady Imelda Marcos. Marcos was eventually declared the winner but allegations of massive fraud erupted into the People Power Revolution which drove the Marcoses into exile and concluded with Aquino's ascension into the presidency.

Fifth Republic elections 
Beginning in 1992, the Solid North did not deliver a solid vote for a single candidate. Two figures associated with Ferdinand Marcos, his widow, Imelda Marcos, and one of his allies, Danding Cojuangco, won in several provinces of the Solid North. In 1998, Imelda, who initially planned to run again, endorsed eventual winner Joseph Estrada, who won in all northern provinces except Cagayan.

In 2004, Fernando Poe Jr. was endorsed by Imelda for the presidency. He would win in most provinces except Benguet, Ifugao, Ilocos Sur, Kalinga, and Mountain Province. Poe narrowly lost to incumbent president Gloria Macapagal Arroyo, but the election would later be tainted by fraud allegations.

In 2010, the Marcoses supported the candidacy of Manny Villar of the Nacionalista Party, while Joseph Estrada ran again but without support from the Marcoses. The bloc was divided between Villar, Estrada, and winner Aquino III. Both Villar and Estrada lost the presidential election. Meanwhile, several Marcoses ran in the elections; Bongbong Marcos, who ran for senator under Villar's slate, won a seat, Imelda Marcos won a seat in the House of Representatives, and Imee Marcos won the gubernatorial election in Ilocos Norte. Bongbong's Senate victory is the highest elected position won by a Marcos since their ouster in 1986. According to Bongbong, his candidacy made the Solid North "intact again."

In 2016, Bongbong ran for vice president as the running mate of senator Miriam Defensor Santiago. Marcos won in all of the Solid North provinces except Batanes, but lost to Leni Robredo. Marcos later filed an electoral protest which was dismissed. In the presidential race, the bloc was not as solid, with some voting for Jejomar Binay, running mate of Estrada in 2010, and Rodrigo Duterte, who has been endorsed by some alongside Marcos, and Grace Poe, daughter of Fernando Poe Jr.

In 2022, Bongbong ran for president alongside Sara Duterte as his running mate. Marcos won again in all provinces except Batanes, while Duterte won in all of the Solid North provinces.

Solid North in the presidential elections

Election maps 
In these maps, the provinces of the candidates where one won at least a plurality of votes is shaded.Key:
Boldface: Winner
Italicized: Marcos, or candidate supported by the Marcoses.

Solid North in the vice presidential elections 
Key:
Boldface: Winner
Italicized: Marcos, or candidate supported by the Marcoses.

See also
Counterparts in other countries
Blue wall (U.S. politics)
Canadian Prairies, Canadian counterpart
Red wall (British politics)
Solid South, American counterpart
Lingayen-Lucena corridor, where the national elections have said to be "won".
Ticket balance#Use in the Philippines

References

Citations

Sources 

 
 
 

Elections in the Philippines
Electoral geography